Clerks is a series of comics published in the late 1990s by Oni Press that continue the adventures of Dante, Randal and other characters from Kevin Smith's film Clerks. Written by Smith but illustrated by varying artists, the style in these comics is very different from that of the later animated series. The books were republished in paperback and hardcover, and were compiled into Clerks (The Comic Books), published by Image Comics in March 2000.

Each of the three original Clerks comics, The Lost Scene, The Holiday Special and The Comic Book,  has exactly 36 pages from front cover to back cover.

Clerks (The Comic Book)
After seeing that Steve-Dave and Walt the Fanboy are overcharging for the extremely popular Star Wars action figures because of the re-release of the films, Dante and Randal decide to start selling them. Randal is about to order a large stock from Frank Howell at Buy Me Toys when Jay and Silent Bob stop the order, saying that all their business is being drawn towards the toys instead of the weed.
 Published: February 1998
 Pencils: Jim Mahfood
 Cover: Gilbert Hernandez
 Letters: Sean Konot

Clerks (The Holiday Special)
Dante finds out his ex, Caitlin Bree, is being transferred to a new psychiatric hospital. While he tries to visit her, Randal is trying to keep his job from rival Vincent, and Jay and Silent Bob help Santa Claus punch in orders.
 Published: December 1998
 Pencils: Jim Mahfood
 Cover: Art Adams
 Letters: Sean Konot

Clerks (The Lost Scene)
The events at Julie Dwyer's wake, scripted but cut from Clerks, that lead to Dante and Randal being chased from the funeral parlor. The two meet Alyssa Jones (of Chasing Amy), Julie's parents (who have hated Dante since they caught him performing oral sex on Julie), and the deceased Julie. An animated version of this scene, in the style of the television series, was included on the Clerks 10th anniversary DVD.  As writer-director Kevin Smith explains in the introduction to the scene on the DVD, it had originally been written for the Clerks film, but was not filmed due to budgetary restraints.  However, the scene makes reference to plot elements from films that Smith had not written yet when Clerks was made, including T.S.'s connection to Julie's death, which was not added to the plot of Mallrats until the reshoots, which implies that changes were made to the original script for the scene. The short was animated by Austin-based Powerhouse Animation Studios, Inc.

At the wake, Randal picks up some death cards from a table and discusses collecting them like baseball cards. Dante also runs into another former high school classmate, Alyssa Jones. Alyssa tells Dante that she was going to see Julie's appearance on Truth or Date (see Mallrats) before she learned of her death. Randal walks over to the two and greets Alyssa with "Hey, 'Finger Cuffs'!", prompting her to angrily storm off.

As Dante and Randal wait in line to see Julie Dwyer's casket, Dante recalls the time he and Julie were caught having sex by her parents. When the two arrive at the casket, they question the choice of Julie's funeral clothing (a tube top), and Randal decides he's bored and wants to go to the car. Dante throws him the keys, but Randal misses the catch and the keys fall into Julie's pants. Dante reaches into the pants to find the keys while Randal rubs his shoulders, making it seem like Dante's upset. Julie's father pushes Randal out of the way and, after seeing Dante's actions, pounces on him. Randal is then pushed by Mrs. Dwyer and bumps into Julie's casket, which topples over, as does Julie's body. Randal catches the keys as they fly into the air, and he and Dante run out abruptly, as depicted in the movie.

 Published: December 1999
 Pencils: Phil Hester and Ande Parks
 Cover: Duncan Fegredo

Where's the Beef?
Starting from where Dante and Randal watch the burning Quick Stop in Clerks II, the comic book follows the pair as they find their job at Mooby's, meeting Becky and Elias, as well as Dante's fiancé, Emma, along the way.

Published: Mid 2006
Art: Jim Mahfood
Design: John Roshell

Chasing Dogma

Chasing Dogma is a comic book mini-series that chronicles the events of the two fictional stoners Jay and Silent Bob between two of their films: Chasing Amy and Dogma. Jay and Silent Bob get the idea that if they go to the town of Shermer, Illinois, where most of John Hughes' movies take place, they could get chicks and be the "blunt connection". Along the way they encounter Holden McNeil, wildlife marshals, and monkeys.

Published: July 1998 – October 1999
Art: Duncan Fegredo

Other appearances
 "On the Perils of Cinema", a one-page comic in which Dante and Randal discuss film's effects on society, appeared in the November 1999 issue of Talk magazine.

References

View Askewniverse comics
Oni Press titles
Comics based on films